Lázaro Valle Martell  (born December 18, 1962) is a Cuban baseball player and Olympic gold medalist.

External links
Olympic Info
 

1962 births
Living people
Olympic baseball players of Cuba
Baseball players at the 2000 Summer Olympics
Olympic silver medalists for Cuba
Olympic medalists in baseball

Medalists at the 2000 Summer Olympics
Central American and Caribbean Games gold medalists for Cuba
Competitors at the 1990 Central American and Caribbean Games
Competitors at the 1993 Central American and Caribbean Games
Goodwill Games medalists in baseball
Central American and Caribbean Games medalists in baseball
Competitors at the 1990 Goodwill Games
20th-century Cuban people